Goruszów  is a village in the administrative district of Gmina Żabno, within Tarnów County, Lesser Poland Voivodeship, in southern Poland.

The village has an approximate population of 105.

References

Villages in Tarnów County